Brandon Scott (born 11 September 1996), known professionally as Swarmz, is a British rapper, singer and professional boxer.

Early and personal life
Brandon Scott was born in the borough of Greenwich, London. He is of Barbadian and 
Jamaican descent. During his childhood, Scott was heavily inspired by the music his family was listening to, including a variety of Jamaican artists. By the time he was attending school, he and his friends had started rapping.

On 24 May 2020, Scott was involved in a car crash near London's Trafalgar Square. A Ferrari 488 rented for a music video shoot crashed into a London bus on Northumberland Avenue. After the crash, he posted videos of the smashed car onto his Instagram account. No injuries were sustained and no arrests were made.

Football career
Scott is a lifelong Arsenal supporter. During his teenage years, Scott was a talented footballer and played for the youth academies of Fulham, Charlton Athletic and Southend United. While at Southend, he had a short loan spell at National League South club East Thurrock United. He was then released by Southend in 2016.
After being released, Scott signed for Isthmian League side Cray Wanderers. In 2017, Scott signed for National League South club Whitehawk. In 2018, he quit football to pursue his music career.

Music career
Scott started making music as a hobby alongside his youth football career.  He originally started making freestyles on SoundCloud, where he went by the name Swarmzy-B, which he later shortened to Swarmz when he started making music professionally.  He released his first video, titled "Money" in 2017 which picked up over 200k views on YouTube.  He then released another single, titled "Murda" in early 2018.  His breakthrough single, "Lyca", was released later that year.  After the single went viral, he was signed to Virgin Records. The artist then proceeded to become a well-known name after releasing tracks such as Bally and Motorola which were brought to light after encouragement from friend Red Jackson.

In 2020, Scott featured alongside Tion Wayne in KSI's single Houdini, which reached number 6 in the UK Singles Chart.

Boxing career

KSI vs Swarmz 

On 27 August 2022, Scott started his boxing career in a bout against YouTuber KSI at The O2 Arena, in London, England. Originally, KSI was scheduled to face Alex Wassabi, however, due to a concussion, Wassabi was replaced by Scott whom had previously called out KSI on a TikTok live. KSI defeated Scott via 2nd round KO and won the ICB World cruiserweight title.

Scott was scheduled to face British YouTuber Kristen Hanby on 15 October 2022, but withdrew on 28 September as Scott required "more time to prepare."

Taylor vs Swarmz
Scott fought British BMX YouTuber Ryan Taylor on 14 January 2023 at Wembley Arena in London, England. Scott won by TKO after Taylor suffered an eye injury and was forced to withdraw.

On 10 February, it was announced that Scott had signed a multi-fight deal with Misfits Boxing.

Discography

Singles

As lead artist

As featured artist

Guest appearances

Boxing record

Pay-per-view bouts

Notes

References

1997 births
Living people
21st-century Black British male singers
Association footballers not categorized by position
Black British male rappers
Cray Wanderers F.C. players
East Thurrock United F.C. players
English footballers
English people of Jamaican descent
English people of Barbadian descent
People from Greenwich
People from the Royal Borough of Greenwich
Singers from London
Southend United F.C. players
Whitehawk F.C. players
YouTube boxers